The Minister of Foreign Affairs (Chancellor) is the foreign minister of Colombia and head of the Ministry of Foreign Affairs, which is in charge of the diplomatic corps and realization of the foreign policy of Colombia. The Minister of Foreign Affairs is appointed by the President.

Duties and responsibilities
The Minister, headed by the Chancellor of the Republic and directed by the President, is the body in charge of formulating, planning, coordinating, executing and evaluating Colombia's foreign policy, international relations and managing the Republic's foreign service. Among the functions that fall on the ministry, among others, are formulating and proposing to the President the policies that Colombia carries out in relation to foreign relations; administer the Foreign Service of Colombia and adopt the necessary measures so that it works with the guidelines and priorities of foreign policy, issue passports and authorize their issuance through agreements with other public entities, when deemed necessary.

Ministers of Foreign Affairs, since 1886

References

Lists of government ministers of Colombia
Foreign affairs ministries